Landry Zahana-Oni (born 8 August 1976 in Abidjan, Ivory Coast) is an Ivorian former professional footballer who played as a striker.

References

External links

1976 births
Living people
Footballers from Abidjan
Ivorian footballers
Ivorian expatriate footballers
Association football forwards
Bromley F.C. players
Luton Town F.C. players
Montrose F.C. players
Ross County F.C. players
Airdrieonians F.C. (1878) players
Dulwich Hamlet F.C. players
Hastings United F.C. players
Carshalton Athletic F.C. players
AEL Limassol players
Stirling Albion F.C. players
English Football League players
Scottish Football League players
Cypriot First Division players
France youth international footballers
Expatriate footballers in England
Expatriate footballers in Scotland
Expatriate footballers in Cyprus